Snowboarding at the Palandöken Mountain will be held at the Dumlu District in Erzurum, Turkey. The eight events are scheduled for January 28 - February 6, 2011.

Men's events

Women's events

Medals table

References

2011 in snowboarding
Snowboarding
Skiing competitions in Turkey
2011